William Kile "Kyle" MacWherter (July 19, 1892 – December 1977) was an American football fullback who played one season for the Decatur Staleys of the NFL. He played college football at Bethany College and Millikin University.

External links
Kile MacWherter Bio (Staley Museum)

References

1892 births
1977 deaths
American football fullbacks
Decatur Staleys players
Bethany Swedes football players
Millikin Big Blue football players
Players of American football from Illinois
People from Virginia, Illinois